Mandy Giblin (born 27 June 1974) is a former Australian middle-distance runner and cross country athlete who competed in late 1990s. She was the winner of the Australian Open 1500m Championship in 1997 and represented Australia at the 1998 IAAF World Cup, 1998 Commonwealth Games and IAAF World Cross Country Championships in both 1998 and 1999.

References

External links 
 Mandy Giblin in London

1974 births
Living people
Australian female middle-distance runners
Australian female long-distance runners
Commonwealth Games competitors for Australia
Athletes (track and field) at the 1998 Commonwealth Games
20th-century Australian women
21st-century Australian women